Psychotria serpens, the creeping psychotria, is a species of flowering plant in the family Rubiaceae, native to Peninsula Malaysia, Southeast Asia, southeastern China, Hainan, Taiwan, the Ryukyu Islands, and central and southern Japan. It is often substituted for "Caulis Trachelospermi" (Trachelospermum jasminoides) in traditional Chinese medicine preparations sold to people with cancer.

References

serpens
Flora of Peninsular Malaysia
Flora of Indo-China
Flora of Southeast China
Flora of Hainan
Flora of Taiwan
Flora of the Ryukyu Islands
Flora of Japan
Plants described in 1771